Martyrs Memorial Monument is a monument built in Bahir Dar, Ethiopia, in memory of those people who gave their life fighting against the Derg dictatorship.

References

Monuments and memorials in Ethiopia